The additions to Daniel comprise three chapters not found in the Hebrew/Aramaic text of Daniel.  The text of these chapters is found in the Koine Greek Septuagint, the earliest Old Greek translation.  

The three additions are as follows.
The Prayer of Azariah and Song of the Three Holy Children: Daniel 3:24–90 inserted between verses 23 and 24 in the Protestant canon (v. 24 becomes v. 91), incorporated within the Fiery Furnace episode. When Shadrach, Meshach, and Abednego are thrown into a furnace for declining to worship an idol, they are rescued by an angel and sing a song of worship. In some Greek Bibles, the Prayer and the Song appear in an appendix to the book of Psalms.
Susanna and the Elders: before Daniel 1:1, a prologue in early Greek manuscripts; chapter 13 in the Vulgate. This episode, along with Bel and the Dragon, is one of "the two earliest examples" of a detective story, according to Christopher Booker. In it, two men attempt to coerce a young woman into having sexual relations with them through blackmail, but are foiled under close questioning by Daniel.
Bel and the Dragon: after Daniel 12:13 in Greek, an epilogue; chapter 14 in the Vulgate. In this tale, Daniel's detective work reveals that a brass idol believed to miraculously consume sacrifices is in fact a front for a corrupt priesthood which is stealing the offerings.

See also
 Deuterocanonical books

References

Further reading
R. H. Charles, ed. (2004 [1913]). The Apocrypha and Pseudepigrapha of the Old Testament. Volume I: Apocrypha. Originally by Clarendon Press, 2004 edition by The Apocryphile Press. pp. 625–664.
J. C. Dancy, ed. (1972). The Shorter Books of the Apocrypha. The Cambridge Bible Commentary on the New English Bible. pp. 210–241.
Alison Salvesen (2006). "The Growth of the Apocrypha". In J. W. Rogerson and Judith M. Lieu, eds., The Oxford Handbook of Biblical Studies. pp. 508–509.

External links
NRSV: Prayer of Azariah
NRSV: Susanna
NRSV: Bel and the Dragon
Daniel (including Azariah and the Song), Sousanna, Bel and the Dragon in the New English Translation of the Septuagint.
 

 
Deuterocanonical books
Jewish apocrypha